Flora Bramley (24 September 1904 – 23 June 1993) was an American-based British actress and comedian.

Career
Born in London, Bramley started out on stage in musical revues, and in June 1926, while visiting relatives in Hollywood, was signed by United Artists. Her first film (for Film Booking Offices of America), The Dude Cowboy (1926) was followed by three more films, all for United Artists. She was persuaded by Harry Brand, general manager of the Buster Keaton studios, to appear in Buster Keaton's College (1927).

In 1928, she was selected to be a WAMPAS Baby Star (sometimes mis-credited as Flora Bromley), receiving a good amount of publicity. That year, her third film, We Americans (1928) was released. In late 1929, she appeared on stage at the Fulton in Oakland, California on 1 December 1929, as Laurel in Stella Dallas, directed by future screen actor and director, Irving Pichel. Bramley's short film career ended when she appeared in The Flirting Widow, in 1930.

Death
She died on 23 June 1993, aged 88, at her home in Moline, Illinois.

External links

Flora Bramley at Virtual History
Flora Bramley profile,  kinopoisk.ru; accessed 11 November 2017. 

1904 births
1993 deaths
British emigrants to the United States
British film actresses
British stage actresses
British musical theatre actresses
Actresses from London
Comedians from London
20th-century British actresses
20th-century British women singers
WAMPAS Baby Stars
20th-century British comedians